K'awchini (Aymara k'awchi, k'awch'i big pot, -ni a suffix to indicate ownership, "the one with a big pot", Hispanicized spelling Cauchini) is a mountain in the Andes of southern Peru, about  high. It is situated in the Puno Region, El Collao Province, Santa Rosa District. K'awchini lies northwest of the mountain Wilantani.

References

Mountains of Puno Region
Mountains of Peru